Burkitt is a name of Old English origin, and may refer to:

Denis Parsons Burkitt (1911–1993), Irish surgeon
Evaline Hilda Burkitt (1876–1955), British suffragette
Francis Crawford Burkitt (1864–1935), British theologian and scholar
Francis Hassard Burkitt (1822–1894), Irish Anglican priest
Frank Burkitt (1843–1914), American newspaper editor and politician
H. H. Burkitt (1876–1961), Irish-Indian civil servant
Jack Burkitt (1926–2003), English footballer
James Parsons Burkitt (1870–1959), Irish civil engineer and ornithologist
M. C. Burkitt (1890–1971), British archaeologist and prehistorian
Robert Burkitt (fl. c. 1912–1940), Irish Anglican priest
William Burkitt (1650–1703), English scholar and educator
William Burkitt (judge) (1838–1908), Irish judge
William John Dwyer Burkitt (1872–1918), British-Indian judge

See also
AqBurkitt
Burkitt's lymphoma
Burkitt Nunatak

References
Alternative origin of Burkitt name